The 1901 Ole Miss Rebels football team was an American football team that represented the University of Mississippi as a member of the Southern Intercollegiate Athletic Association (SIAA) during the 1901 SIAA football season. In its first season under head coaches William Shibley and Daniel S. Martin, Ole Miss compiled a 2–4 record (0–4 against SIAA opponents) and was outscored by a total of 129 to 34. A seventh game with Christian Brothers was canceled. Right end F. W. Elmer was the team captain.

Schedule

References

Ole Miss
Ole Miss Rebels football seasons
Ole Miss Rebels football